Dennis J. Bennett  (October 28, 1917 – November 1, 1991) was an American Episcopal priest, who, starting in 1960, testified that he had received the Baptism of the Holy Spirit.

Born in England but raised in California,  Bennett was a seminal figure in the Charismatic Movement within the Christian church. After proclaiming on April 3, 1960 from the pulpit that he had been baptized in the Holy Spirit, he was asked to resign at St. Mark's Episcopal Church, a 2600-member congregation in Van Nuys, California. Bennett was featured in articles in both Newsweek and Time magazines and rather than subjecting his church to a media frenzy, he did resign his pastorate. He continued his ministry at St. Luke's Episcopal Church in Seattle, Washington until 1981 when he left the parish to found and lead the Christian Renewal Association with his wife Rita. He was also instrumental in the 1973 founding of Episcopal Renewal Ministries (now named Acts 29 ministry).

Bibliography

Works 
 Nine O'Clock in the Morning 
 The Holy Spirit and You: a study-guide to the spirit-filled life (1971) 
 Trinity of Man 
 Moving right along in the Spirit

References

External links 
 Official Biography
  Dennis Bennett Papers at the Regent University Special Collections

1917 births
1991 deaths
20th-century American Episcopalians
American Charismatics